State Route 32 (SR 32) is a  state highway in southwestern Pickens County, in the U.S. state of Alabama. The highway enters the state as a continuation of Mississippi Highway 14 (MS 14), and continues east to an intersection with SR 17 at Cochrane, a small, unincorporated community southwest of Aliceville. MS 14, SR 32, and SR 17 serve as the connecting routes between Macon, Mississippi and Aliceville.

History

The current version of SR 32 was formed in 1957, serving as a replacement of County Road 30. A previous alignment of SR 32 existed between 1940 and 1957, connecting Oneonta and Albertville. The former SR 32 is now designated as SR 75.

Route description
SR 32 begins at the Mississippi state line, in Pickens County, heading east on a two-lane undivided road. The highway continues west into Mississippi as MS 14. The highway travels through open farmland, intersecting CR 1. SR 32 reaches its eastern terminus at an intersection with SR 17 in Cochrane.

Major intersections

See also

References

032
Transportation in Pickens County, Alabama